Ingo Gerhartz (born 9 December 1965) is a German Air Force lieutenant general. He has been serving as the Inspector of the Air Force since 2018.

Military career
Gerhartz joined the German Air Force on 1 July 1985 as a conscript. From 1986 to 1987 he attended officer training in Fürstenfeldbruck.

He was then selected for flying training, attending Euro-NATO Joint Jet Pilot Training at Sheppard Air Force Base, Texas from 1988 to 1989, where he flew the Cessna T-37 Tweet and Northrop T-38 Talon trainer aircraft. From 1989 to 1990, he then attended weapon systems training for the F-4 Phantom II at George Air Force Base, California.

From 1990 to 1998, Gerhartz served as part of Fighter Wing 71 (Jagdgeschwader 71), operating the F-4F Phantom II, and stationed at Wittmundhafen Air Base. There he also served as the wing's operations officer.

From 2000 to 2003, Gerhartz commanded the flying group of Fighter Wing 73 (Jagdgeschwader 73), operating the MiG-29 Fulcrum at Laage Air Base.

From 2008 to 2010, Gerhartz commanded Fighter-Bomber Wing 31 (Jagdbombergeschwader 31), operating the Panavia Tornado IDS and Eurofighter Typhoon. During this time, he deployed to Camp Marmal, Afghanistan, as part of NATO's International Security Assistance Force (ISAF) mission. During the deployment, which lasted from February to October 2009, Gerhartz flew more than 50 missions in the Tornado.

From 2010 to 2018, Gerhartz held various staff positions in Air Force Forces Command (Luftwaffenführungskommando), Air Force Command (Kommando Luftwaffe), and in the Federal Ministry of Defence.

Since 29 May 2018, Gerhartz has been serving as the Inspector of the Air Force (Inspekteur der Luftwaffe), the commander of the German Air Force.

Personal life 
Gerhartz is married to a teacher, they have two children.

References 

Living people
1965 births
Place of birth missing (living people)
Lieutenant generals of the German Air Force
German Air Force pilots
People from Cochem
Military personnel from Rhineland-Palatinate
German military personnel of the War in Afghanistan (2001–2021)